The 2022–23 UEFA Europa League knockout phase began on 16 February with the knockout round play-offs and will end on 31 May 2023 with the final at the Puskás Aréna in Budapest, Hungary, to decide the champions of the 2022–23 UEFA Europa League. A total of 24 teams compete in the knockout phase.

Times are CET/CEST, as listed by UEFA (local times, if different, are in parentheses).

Qualified teams
The knockout phase will involve 24 teams: the 16 teams which qualified as winners and runners-up of each of the eight groups in the group stage, and the eight third-placed teams from the Champions League group stage.

Europa League group stage winners and runners-up

Champions League group stage third-placed teams

Format
Each tie in the knockout phase, apart from the final, is played over two legs, with each team playing one leg at home. The team that scores more goals on aggregate over the two legs advances to the next round. If the aggregate score is level, then 30 minutes of extra time is played (the away goals rule is not applied). If the score is still level at the end of extra time, the winners are decided by a penalty shoot-out. In the final, which is played as a single match, if the score is level at the end of normal time, extra time is played, followed by a penalty shoot-out if the score is still level.

The mechanism of the draws for each round is as follows:
In the draw for the knockout round play-offs, the eight group runners-up were seeded, and the eight Champions League group third-placed teams were unseeded. The seeded teams were drawn against the unseeded teams, with the seeded teams hosting the second leg. Teams from the same association could not be drawn against each other.
In the draw for the round of 16, the eight group winners were seeded, and the eight winners of the knockout round play-offs were unseeded. Again, the seeded teams were drawn against the unseeded teams, with the seeded teams hosting the second leg. Teams from the same association could not be drawn against each other.
In the draws for the quarter-finals and semi-finals, there will be no seedings, and teams from the same association could be drawn against each other. As the draws for the quarter-finals and semi-finals will be held together before the quarter-finals were played, the identity of the quarter-final winners will not be known at the time of the semi-final draw. A draw will also be held to determine which semi-final winner will be designated as the "home" team for the final (for administrative purposes as it will be played at a neutral venue).

Schedule
The schedule is as follows (all draws are held at the UEFA headquarters in Nyon, Switzerland).

Bracket

Knockout round play-offs

The draw for the knockout round play-offs was held on 7 November 2022, 13:00 CET.

Summary

The first legs were played on 16 February, and the second legs were played on 23 February 2023.

|}

Matches

Manchester United won 4–3 on aggregate.

Juventus won 4–1 on aggregate.

Sporting CP won 5–1 on aggregate.

3–3 on aggregate. Shakhtar Donetsk won 5–4 on penalties.

Union Berlin won 3–1 on aggregate.

5–5 on aggregate. Bayer Leverkusen won 5–3 on penalties.

Sevilla won 3–2 on aggregate.

Roma won 2–1 on aggregate.

Round of 16

The draw for the round of 16 was held on 24 February 2023, 12:00 CET.

Summary

The first legs were played on 9 March, and the second legs were played on 16 March 2023.

|}

Matches

Union Saint-Gilloise won 6–3 on aggregate.

Sevilla won 2–1 on aggregate.

Juventus won 3–0 on aggregate.

Bayer Leverkusen won 4–0 on aggregate.

3–3 on aggregate. Sporting CP won 5–3 on penalties.

Manchester United won 5–1 on aggregate.

Roma won 2–0 on aggregate.

Feyenoord won 8–2 on aggregate.

Quarter-finals

The draw for the quarter-finals was held on 17 March 2023, 13:00 CET.

Summary

The first legs will be played on 13 April, and the second legs will be played on 20 April 2023.

|}

Matches

Semi-finals

The draw for the semi-finals was held on 17 March 2023, 13:00 CET, after the quarter-final draw.

Summary

The first legs will be played on 11 May, and the second legs will be played on 18 May 2023.

|}

Matches

Final

The final will be played on 31 May 2023 at the Puskás Aréna in Budapest. A draw was held on 17 March 2023, after the quarter-final and semi-final draws, to determine the "home" team for administrative purposes.

Notes

References

External links

3
February 2023 sports events in Europe
March 2023 sports events in Europe
April 2023 sports events in Europe
May 2023 sports events in Europe
UEFA Europa League knockout phases